In enzymology, a prenylcysteine oxidase is an enzyme that catalyzes the chemical reaction

an S-prenyl-L-cysteine + O2 + H2O  a prenal + L-cysteine + H2O2

The 3 substrates of this enzyme are S-prenyl-L-cysteine, O2, and H2O, whereas its 3 products are prenal, L-cysteine, and H2O2.

This enzyme belongs to the family of oxidoreductases, specifically those acting on a sulfur group of donors with oxygen as acceptor.  The systematic name of this enzyme class is S-prenyl-L-cysteine:oxygen oxidoreductase. This enzyme is also called prenylcysteine lyase.

Human protein and gene
 Prenylcysteine oxidase 1, symbol PCYOX1, gene on chromosome 2

See also
 Hemithioacetals in nature, for mechanism of action
 Flavin adenine dinucleotide, cofactor of the enzyme
 Prenylation, a process forming S-prenyl-L-cysteine

References

 
 

EC 1.8.3
Enzymes of unknown structure